Pliomelaena zonogastra is a species of tephritid or fruit flies in the genus Pliomelaena of the family Tephritidae.

Distribution
India.

References

Tephritinae
Insects described in 1913
Taxa named by Mario Bezzi
Diptera of Asia